The Rødovre Mighty Bulls is a Danish professional ice hockey team based in Rødovre, Denmark, playing in the Metal Ligaen, the top tier of Danish ice hockey. The club was founded in 1961 and play their home games in the Rødovre Skøjte Arena which has a capacity of 3,600 spectators.

The club has won the Danish championship 6 times in 1978, 1983, 1985, 1986, 1990 and 1999.

From 1977 to 1979, the team was coached by Boris Kulagin, the former coach of the Soviet national ice hockey team. Kulagin joined the Danish team after getting fired as head coach of the Soviet national team following a disappointing 3rd-place finish at the 1977 World Ice Hockey Championships. Rødovre had used contacts at the Soviet Embassy in Copenhagen, asking them to find a suitable coach for the team. Much to their surprise, they received the famous World Championship winning coach. The fact that such a high level coach was sent to coach in the then lowly Danish league was seen by many as an additional form of punishment for the poor result at the 1977 World Championships. Under Kulagin's guidance, the team won their first Danish title in 1978.

Retired numbers
  5  Tommy Pedersen
  29  Jannik Stæhr

Notable former Rødovre Mighty Bulls players
 Tommy Pedersen
 Bent Hansen
 Valeri Bragin
 Kim "Musen" Andersen
 Olaf Eller
 Anatoli Chistyakov
 Jesper Duus
 Karsten Arvidsen
 Juha Riihijärvi
 Michael Smidt
 Christian Larrivée
 Jeremy Stevenson
 Patrice Lefebvre
 Morten Madsen
 Jannik Hansen
 Mikkel Bødker
 Lars Eller
 Mads Bødker
 Sebastian Dahm
 
Players in bold are NHL alumni.

Championships

 1978
 1983
 1985
 1986
 1990
 1999

References

Ice hockey teams in Denmark
Ice hockey teams in the Øresund Region